The Coppin State Eagles men's basketball statistical leaders are individual statistical leaders of the Coppin State Eagles men's basketball program in various categories, including points, rebounds, assists, steals, and blocks. Within those areas, the lists identify single-game, single-season, and career leaders. The Eagles represent Coppin State University in the NCAA's Mid-Eastern Athletic Conference.

Coppin State began competing in intercollegiate basketball in 1964.  The NCAA did not officially record assists as a stat until the 1983–84 season, and blocks and steals until the 1985–86 season, but Coppin State's record books includes players in these stats before these seasons. These lists are updated through the end of the 2020–21 season.

Scoring

Rebounds

Assists

Steals

Blocks

References

Lists of college basketball statistical leaders by team
Statistical